Hesar Now may refer to:
 Hesar Now, Firuzeh
 Hesar Now, Nishapur